Steven Bradley Ott (born August 19, 1982) is a Canadian former professional ice hockey player and current assistant coach of the  St. Louis Blues of the National Hockey League (NHL). Picked 25th overall in the 2000 NHL Entry Draft, Ott previously played for the Dallas Stars, Buffalo Sabres, St. Louis Blues, Detroit Red Wings and Montreal Canadiens.

Playing career

Early career and years in Dallas
Born in Summerside, Prince Edward Island, Ott later moved to Stoney Point, Ontario. He played his minor hockey with the Sun County Panthers of the Ontario Minor Hockey Association (OMHA) and the Belle River Canadiens (Great Lakes Junior C Hockey League) in the mid-1990s before signing for the 1998–99 season with the Leamington Flyers Junior B club (WOJHL). After a solid season, Ott was selected in the second round, 41st overall, of the 1998 OHL Priority Selection by the Windsor Spitfires.

Ott was a first round draft pick of the Dallas Stars, 25th overall, at the 2000 NHL Entry Draft. He then played junior hockey for the OHL's Windsor Spitfires and had a brief spell with the Utah Grizzlies of the American Hockey League (AHL) before joining the Stars' NHL roster.

Ott represented Canada at the 2001 World Junior Hockey Championship, helping the team win the bronze medal. As part of his "peskiness", he learned and memorized offensive phrases in other languages to strategically annoy his opponents on the ice in a language they could understand. During the 2004–05 NHL lockout, Ott played for the Hamilton Bulldogs of the AHL, where he set a team record for penalty minutes in a season with 279.

In the 2007–08 season, Ott was suspended by the NHL for three games for a hit to the head of Jordan Leopold of the Colorado Avalanche during a game on March 9, 2008. Ott also played in 18 playoff games for the Stars during their run to the Western Conference Finals.

Ott was suspended one game by the NHL on March 1, 2009, for an incident during a game on February 28, 2009, against the Anaheim Ducks, where he received a match penalty for eye gouging Travis Moen. Ott claimed the eye gouge was accidental.

During the 2009–10 season, on March 31, 2010, Ott scored his first NHL career hat-trick at home against the San Jose Sharks.

Buffalo Sabres
On July 2, 2012, Ott was traded, along with Adam Pardy, to the Buffalo Sabres in exchange for Derek Roy. As a Sabre, he quickly became a fan favorite due to his hard work ethic, playing ability, toughness, and desire to win. He scored his first goal as a Sabre in Buffalo's home opener on January 20, 2013, on a power play goal against the Philadelphia Flyers. He had his first fight as a Sabre on January 25, 2013, at home against Carolina Hurricanes defenseman Tim Gleason. On March 19, 2013, Ott scored an early goal in the first period and the overtime winner against the Montreal Canadiens to record his first multi-goal game with the Sabres. As of April 4, 2013, he was promoted to alternate captain after the Sabres traded captain Jason Pominville to the Minnesota Wild at the 2013 NHL trade deadline, joining Thomas Vanek and Drew Stafford as alternate captains for the Sabres. Ott finished his first season with Buffalo with nine goals, 15 assists, 93 penalty minutes and five fights in 48 games, though the Sabres failed to make the 2013 playoffs.

On October 1, 2013, Ott and Thomas Vanek were both awarded the captaincy of the Sabres. However, later in the month on October 27, Vanek was traded to the New York Islanders, leaving Ott as the team's sole captain.

St. Louis Blues
Approaching the 2013–14 trade deadline, Ott and fellow impending free agent Ryan Miller were traded by the rebuilding Sabres to the St. Louis Blues in exchange for Jaroslav Halák, Chris Stewart, William Carrier and two future draft picks.

On December 5, 2015, Ott suffered a season-ending injury in a game against the Toronto Maple Leafs. Attempting to deliver a body check to Leafs captain Dion Phaneuf, Ott missed the hit and fell awkwardly into the boards. He was diagnosed with a torn hamstring and missed the remainder of the 2015–16 season. He practiced with the Blues prior to Game 3 of their first-round series against the defending champion Chicago Blackhawks but did not play until their second-round series against the Dallas Stars. He played in 9 playoff games, putting up one assist as the Blues lost in the Western Conference Final to the San Jose Sharks.

Detroit Red Wings
Becoming a free agent in the offseason, Ott signed a one-year contract with the Detroit Red Wings on July 1, 2016.

Montreal Canadiens
On February 28, 2017, Ott was traded to the Montreal Canadiens in exchange for a 6th round draft pick in the 2018 NHL Entry Draft.

Coaching career

St. Louis Blues
On May 25, 2017, Ott retired from his professional hockey playing career, and was named as an assistant coach for the St. Louis Blues for the 2017–18 season.  He finished his career with 848 career games in the NHL.

On June 12, 2019, Ott won the Stanley Cup as the Blues defeated the Boston Bruins in seven games.

Personal life
Ott has been married twice and has three children, one from his first marriage, and two from his current marriage. Before beginning his professional hockey career, Ott raced kneeldown outboard hydroplanes. He gave it up at age 17 to focus on hockey. As of 2014 his father was a professional boat racer in the American Power Boat Association (APBA) and Ott was pit crewing for him during his off-season in the summer. About power boating Ott says "it’s extremely dangerous. A lot of people get injured, and life-threatening stuff as well. It’s something that you have to have in your blood to be able to do it, but I think it’s passed down from my dad."

Career statistics

Regular season and playoffs

International

Awards and honours

References

External links
 

1982 births
Buffalo Sabres captains
Buffalo Sabres players
Canadian ice hockey centres
Dallas Stars draft picks
Dallas Stars players
Detroit Red Wings players
Ice hockey people from Ontario
Ice hockey people from Prince Edward Island
Iowa Stars players
Living people
Montreal Canadiens players
National Hockey League first-round draft picks
People from Essex County, Ontario
People from Summerside, Prince Edward Island
Stanley Cup champions
St. Louis Blues players
Windsor Spitfires players
St. Louis Blues coaches
Canadian ice hockey coaches